Doncaster–Mordialloc Road is a major arterial road in the eastern & south-eastern suburbs of Melbourne. This name is not widely known to most drivers, as the entire allocation is still best known as by the names of its constituent parts: Victoria Street, Wetherby Road, Middleborough Road, Stephensons Road, Clayton Road and Boundary Road. This article will deal with the entire length of the corridor for sake of completion, as well to avoid confusion between declarations.

History
Doncaster–Mordialloc Road was signed as Metropolitan Route 23 between Doncaster Road and Wells Road in 1989.

The passing of the Road Management Act 2004 granted the responsibility of overall management and development of Victoria's major arterial roads to VicRoads: in 2004, VicRoads declared Doncaster–Mordialloc Road (Arterial #5803) from King Street in Templestowe to Wells Road in Braeside. The road is still presently known (and signposted) as its continuous parts along its entire length.

Major intersections

Gallery

References 

Roads in Victoria (Australia)
Transport in the City of Whitehorse
Transport in the City of Monash
Transport in the City of Manningham
Transport in the City of Kingston (Victoria)